Newman Field is a stadium located on the campus of Catawba College Salisbury, North Carolina.  It is primarily used for baseball and was home to the Salisbury Senators.  It was built in 1934. It holds 3,000 people.

References

Minor league baseball venues
Baseball venues in North Carolina
Sports venues in Rowan County, North Carolina
College baseball venues in the United States
Sports venues completed in 1934
1934 establishments in North Carolina